The 2015 Vuelta a España was the 70th edition of the race. It was the last of cycling's three Grand Tours to take place during the 2015 road cycling season. The race started in Marbella on 22 August and finished in Madrid on 13 September; three days were in Andorra, including the whole of stage 11 and the first of the race's two rest days.

All 17 UCI World Tour teams were automatically entitled to start the race. In March 2015, five UCI Professional Continental teams were awarded wildcard places in the race by the organisers, . As each team was entitled to enter nine riders, the peloton at the beginning of the first stage consisted of 198 riders. The riders came from 37 countries; France, Spain and Italy all had 20 or more riders in the race. The startlist included all of the top four riders from the 2015 Tour de France: Chris Froome, Nairo Quintana and Alejandro Valverde (both ), and Vincenzo Nibali. The riders had an average age of 29.13 years: the oldest rider to start the race was 38-year-old Haimar Zubeldia and the youngest was 20-year-old Matej Mohorič.

At the end of the final stage, there were 158 riders left in the race, with 40 riders failing to finish. Froome and Nibali were both among the riders who left the race before it reached Madrid: Froome abandoned the race after breaking his foot on stage 11; Nibali was disqualified after receiving illegal assistance from his team car during stage 2. The race was won by Fabio Aru (Astana). He first took the red jersey (indicating the lead of the general classification) following the mountainous stage 11. He lost it first to Joaquim Rodríguez on the uphill finish of stage 16, then to Tom Dumoulin in the individual time trial on stage 17. Aru was six seconds behind Dumoulin going into the penultimate stage of the race; an attack on the final climb of the Vuelta dropped Dumoulin and Aru was able to take the overall victory in the race. Rodríguez finished second, 57 seconds behind Aru, with Rafał Majka a further 12 seconds behind in third. Valverde won the points classification and Rodríguez the combination classification. The mountains classification was won by Omar Fraile. Movistar won the team classification.

Teams

The 17 UCI WorldTeams were automatically invited to participate in the Vuelta. In addition, the race organisers, Unipublic, invited five wildcard teams. These included , the only Spanish-registered UCI Professional Continental team.

 UCI WorldTeams

  (riders)
  (riders)
  (riders)
  (riders)
  (riders)
  (riders)
  (riders)
  (riders)
  (riders)
  (riders)
  (riders)
  (riders)
  (riders)
  (riders)
  (riders)
  (riders)
  (riders)

UCI Professional Continental teams

  (riders)
  (riders)
  (riders)
  (riders)
  (riders)

Cyclists

By starting number

By team

By nationality
The 198 riders that competed in the 2015 Vuelta a España represented 37 countries. Riders from twelve countries won stages during the race; the largest number of stage wins for any country was four, achieved by both the Spanish riders and the Dutch riders.

References

External links

2015 Vuelta a España
2015